Seamaster may refer to:
 the Martin P6M SeaMaster flying boat
 the Omega Seamaster wristwatch
 the yacht aboard which noted New Zealand sailor Peter Blake was killed.
 a mini-submarine craft for deep diving in the ocean, Seamaster 2 is a red unit, there is also a yellow unit, name unknown at present.